Edwin Duing Eshleman (December 4, 1920 – January 10, 1985) was an American politician who represented Pennsylvania in the United States House of Representatives as a Republican from 1967 to 1977.

Biography
He was born in Quarryville, Pennsylvania and attended Franklin and Marshall College, receiving a B.S. in 1942.  He later studied at Temple University.  During World War II, he served as a lieutenant in the United States Coast Guard.  After the war, he taught school then was elected to the Pennsylvania House of Representatives, serving from 1954 to 1966.  While serving in the state legislature Eshleman served at times as both Minority and Majority Whip.  He was elected in 1966 to the 90th Congress, representing the 16th Congressional District in southcentral Pennsylvania.  He was re-elected 4 times serving in the 91st, 92nd, 93rd, and 94th Congresses, from January 3, 1967 to January 3, 1977.  Retiring for health reasons after 5 terms, he endorsed and was succeeded in Congress by his Administrative Assistant and chief of staff, Robert Smith Walker.

He lived in Lancaster, Pennsylvania, where he died.

References
 Retrieved on 2009-01-24

1920 births
1985 deaths
Republican Party members of the Pennsylvania House of Representatives
American Lutherans
Politicians from Lancaster, Pennsylvania
Temple University alumni
United States Coast Guard personnel of World War II
Franklin & Marshall College alumni
Republican Party members of the United States House of Representatives from Pennsylvania
20th-century American politicians
20th-century Lutherans